Nellihudikeri  is a village in the southern state of Karnataka, India. It is located in the Kushalnagara taluk of Kodagu district.

Demographics
 India census, Nellihudikeri had a population of 6291 with 3123 males and 3168 females.

See also
 Kodagu
 Mangalore
 Districts of Karnataka

References

External links
 http://Kodagu.nic.in/

Villages in Kodagu district